"Joltin'" Jeff Chandler (born September 3, 1956, in Philadelphia, Pennsylvania) is a former boxer. Chandler reigned as the Lineal and WBA world Bantamweight Champion from November 1980 to April 1984.

Professional boxing career
The 5'7" (67 inches - 1.70 metres) tall Philadelphian began his professional career with a four-round draw in 1976 after only two amateur bouts. Chandler then began a four-year string of victories culminating in a challenge for the world's lineal and WBA 118-pound championship held by Julian Solís. On November 14, 1980, Chandler won the title by a fourteenth-round knockout in Miami, becoming the first American fighter to hold the bantamweight crown in over 30 years.

Chandler's first defence was against former champion Jorge Luján, winning on points in fifteen rounds.  He then travelled to Japan to face Asian champion Eljiro Murata, and although he was almost floored in the early rounds, Chandler came back to hold his title with a draw. Many ringside observers felt Chandler deserved a clear points victory. With his status in the boxing world rising, Chandler followed this up with a repeat victory over Solis, this time in seven rounds. Chandler finished 1981 against Murata, earning a thirteenth-round knockout rematch win.

In March 1982, Chandler faced the only opponent who ever defeated him as an amateur, fellow Philadelphian Johnny Carter. The tables were turned this time as he scored a sixth-round knockout on national television. Soon after, Chandler was sidelined by an injury sustained in a street-fight. During a traffic altercation in Philadelphia, he was stabbed on the right shoulder with a broken bottle, leaving a distinctive circular scar, but doing no permanent damage. Chandler went on to defend his title by beating Miguel Iriarte before finishing 1982.

In 1983, Chandler ventured into the Super bantamweight ranks, winning a ten-round decision over Hector Cortez. He then faced tough Angelino Oscar Muniz in another non-title bout. Muniz took the fight to Chandler, winning narrowly on points over ten rounds, Chandler's first defeat in the professional ranks. He defended once more against Murata (another knockout, in the tenth round), then faced Muniz again, this time with the title on the line. A severe cut over Muniz's eye brought a stoppage in the seventh round, enabling Chandler to retain his belt by a seventh-round technical knockout.

On April 7, 1984, Chandler faced the undefeated contender Richie Sandoval. This time his skills were not enough to stop an eager young foe. Sandoval took the title with a fifteenth-round knockout.  This turned out to be Chandler's last fight. He elected to have surgery on cataracts that had been diagnosed the year before. Rather than risk blindness, Chandler retired from boxing.

He finished his career with a record of 33 wins, 2 losses and 2 draws. Jeff Chandler provided boxing fans with many memorable performances. In 2000, he was elected to the International Boxing Hall of Fame at Canastota, New York.

Professional boxing record

See also
List of world bantamweight boxing champions

References

External links

Jeff Chandler - CBZ Profile
Chandler biography and highlights
IBHOF Bio

 

|-

1956 births
Living people
American male boxers
Boxers from Philadelphia
African-American boxers
World bantamweight boxing champions
World Boxing Association champions
The Ring (magazine) champions
International Boxing Hall of Fame inductees